Peter K. Michael is an American attorney. He served as Attorney General of Wyoming from 2013 to 2019. The former Attorney General Gregory A. Phillips appointed him Chief Deputy Attorney General on May 1, 2011. Michael took over as acting-Attorney General on July 9, 2013, and succeeded him officially on September 6, 2013. His term of office is 4 years.

External links
 Official website of the Attorney General of Wyoming

References

21st-century American politicians
Living people
People from Media, Pennsylvania
University of Wyoming College of Law alumni
Wyoming Attorneys General
Wyoming Republicans
Yale University alumni
Year of birth missing (living people)